Events from the year 2018 in Saint Lucia

Incumbents
 Monarch: Elizabeth II
 Governor-General: Neville Cenac
 Prime Minister: Allen Chastanet

Events

12 January – Neville Cenac was appointed Governor-General of Saint Lucia

Deaths

29 July – Arsene James, politician, Minister of Education and Culture 2006–2011 (b. 1944).

References

 
Years of the 21st century in Saint Lucia
Saint Lucia
Saint Lucia
2010s in Saint Lucia